The Commercial Bank and Banker's House is an unusual combination building, housing both a bank premises and the principal banker's residence, at 206 Main Street and 107 Canal Street in Natchez, Mississippi.  Built-in 1833, it is a remarkably high-quality and well-preserved example of Greek Revival architecture.  It was designated a National Historic Landmark in 1974.  The bank portion of the building, used for a time by a Christian Science congregation, is presently vacant, while the house portion is a private residence. Both the buildings have carved limestone used extensively, columns lintels, window sills, and the entire facia are all carved limestone with the walls being 20" thick brick construction with scored plaster to have the appearance of large limestone blocks.

Description and history
The Commercial Bank and Banker's House are a single structure that occupies what are now two separate properties.  The two parcels form an L shape surrounding an unrelated commercial building at the southern junction of South Canal and Main Streets in downtown Natchez.  The bank portion of the building presents its façade to Main Street, while the house presents a facade to South Canal Street, with an intervening front yard.  The bank portion is a tall single story in height, with a facade of dressed marble.  Its side walls, and those of the house, are finished in stuccoed brick. The bank facade has a Greek Temple projection, with four Ionic columns supporting a full entablature and gabled pediment.  The columns are set on a low plinth, with side-facing stairs providing access to the main entrance.

The house facade is five bays wide, with a center entrance sheltered by a simpler portico.  This one has two Doric columns supporting a detailed entablature, with a wrought iron balcony railing above.  The house interior has some of the most impressive hand carved door surrounds and window surrounds in the US. It has 28" high baseboards and impressive large doors throughout. The rooms are large size for this time period. 
The Commercial Bank was chartered in 1833, and this unique building was constructed soon afterward.  For security reasons, it was designed to contain both the bank and the banker's residence. Levin R. Marshall, who lived at the suburban Natchez Richmond estate, helped found the bank and was president for a number of years. it is said that he created this very impressive residence for himself and his family as a town house. Another interesting fact is it has italian marble mantles throughout the home both upstairs and down, unusual because the usual is to use wood mantles in the less public spaces. 

The bank portion of the building has seen a variety of uses over its period of existence, including as a Christian Science center in the 1970s.  It presently stands empty.  The house portion is a private residence. which has in the past been a girls school and a boarding house for many years, by verbal tradition was enjoyed by Jesse James. It has had a complete renovation in 2021/2022.

See also
List of National Historic Landmarks in Mississippi
National Register of Historic Places listings in Adams County, Mississippi

References

External links

Historic American Buildings Survey photos, etc., of Commercial Bank and Banker's House are available by searching HABS/HAER here for (1) Commercial Bank, 206 Main Street, Natchez, MS and (2) Banker's House, Commercial Bank, 107 South Canal Street, Natchez, MS

National Historic Landmarks in Mississippi
Former Christian Science churches, societies and buildings in the United States
Houses in Natchez, Mississippi
Houses completed in 1833
Greek Revival church buildings in Mississippi
Greek Revival houses in Mississippi
19th-century Christian Science church buildings
National Register of Historic Places in Natchez, Mississippi
Individually listed contributing properties to historic districts on the National Register in Mississippi
1833 establishments in Mississippi